Tarkeeb is a 1984 Indian Hindi-language film directed by Ravikant Nagaich. The film stars  Mithun Chakraborty in the lead along with Ranjeeta and Shakti Kapoor. The film was a remake of Telugu film Driver Ramudu.

Plot
Tarkeeb is an action film with suspense twists. It has Mithun Chakraborty in the lead, who had earlier done successful films Surakshaa and Wardat with Ravikant Nagaich.

Cast
Mithun Chakraborty as Dinesh
Ranjeeta as Bela
Shakti Kapoor as Sundar
Madan Puri as Naagpal
Sharat Saxena as Vikram

Soundtrack
Lyrics: Anjaan

References

http://ibosnetwork.com/asp/filmbodetails.asp?id=Tarkeeb -

External links
 

1984 films
1980s Hindi-language films
Indian action films
Films scored by Bappi Lahiri
1984 action films
Hindi-language action films
Hindi remakes of Telugu films
Films directed by Ravikant Nagaich